Susan Skoog (1965- ), American filmmaker, is best known for her low-budget but highly acclaimed debut film Whatever (1998). Asked why she felt the desire to make the film, Skoog explained to IndieWIRE: "I felt like I hadn’t seen in film what I saw when I was a teenager. And especially from a female perspective. I felt like there hadn’t been a film that really nailed what it was like to be a suburban girl growing up in this country." Skoog has expressed repeatedly that the female experience/perspective, particularly that of girls, has historically been underrepresented in the film industry (e.g., "Boys tend to blame their circumstances and the world outside them, whereas girls tend to blame themselves and quit. Girls quit much quicker and easier, and I think that hadn’t been dealt with in film yet."), but she believes that is changing by way of a "natural progression" toward sex equality.

Skoog was raised in the town of Red Bank, New Jersey, and graduated from NYU in 1987 with a degree in theatre and film. She has cited Mike Leigh and Eric Rohmer as influences on her work.

References

1965 births
American filmmakers
Tisch School of the Arts alumni
Living people